Drafting or draughting may refer to:

 Campdrafting, an Australian equestrian sport
 Drafting (aerodynamics), slipstreaming
 Drafting (writing), writing something that is likely to be amended
 Technical drawing, the act and discipline of composing diagrams that communicates how something functions or is to be constructed. E.g.:
 Architectural drawing
 Electrical drawing
 Engineering drawing
 Plumbing drawing
 Structural drawing
 Textile manufacturing weaving pattern
 Conscription into compulsory military service
 Draft (sports), where new players are chosen by the teams rather than the players choosing their teams
 Drafting, a hand spinning method of preparing fibers for spinning into yarn
 Drafting dog, a dog drawing a cart

See also
 Draft (disambiguation)